Albert Bernard Hollowood (3 June 1910 – 28 March 1981) was an English writer, cartoonist and economist. He was editor of the humorous weekly magazine Punch from 1957 to 1968.

Life and career 

Born on 3 June 1910 at Burslem, Stoke-on-Trent, Staffordshire, Bernard Hollowood was educated at Hanley High School and St Paul's College, Cheltenham. He read economics at London University and graduated in 1936. He subsequently taught commerce, economics and geography at the City School of Commerce, Stoke-on-Trent. He moved to Loughborough College in 1941, where he was Head of the Commerce Department.

He was a self-taught artist. He generally used a mapping pen and Indian ink on Whatman paper. Though not a good draughtsman, he sold his first drawings to Chamber's Journal, Lilliput and Men Only in 1942. Before long he was contributing drawings and articles to Punch.

He left Loughborough College in 1944 and joined the staff of The Economist. He stayed with the journal until 1945, becoming assistant editor. He was an expert on industrial ceramics, and was editor of Pottery and Glass from 1944 to 1950. From 1946 to 1947 he was research officer at the Council of Industrial Design.

Hollowood was elected to the Punch Table in 1945. He was appointed the magazine's editor in 1957. He set very high standards, and would often require cartoonists to revise their submissions several times. Under him, Punch'''s circulation continued at around 115,000 copies, but he never became as well known as Malcolm Muggeridge, his immediate predecessor as editor. He left Punch in 1968.

From 1957 to 1960 he was a pocket cartoonist for the Sunday Times. He was also a regular contributor of articles or cartoons to many other publications, including The Times, Geographical Magazine, Socialist Commentary, the Surrey Advertiser, News Chronicle, The Cricketer, London Opinion, The New Yorker, the Evening Standard, and the Daily and Sunday Telegraph. As well as his own name, he also wrote and drew as 'Mammon'. A small selection of his cartoons is viewable online at the British Cartoon Archive.

He was a member of the Court of Governors of the London School of Economics. He was elected a Fellow of the Royal Society of Arts (FRSA) in 1949. In 1962 he was awarded the Silver Medal of the Society for his lecture on humour. Bernard Levin interviewed him for his TV series The Levin Interview in 1966.

 The cricketer 

He was a good enough cricketer to play Minor Counties cricket for Staffordshire between 1930 and 1947 as a batsman and occasional bowler, and he also captained Burslem who played in the North Staffordshire League. His father and two brothers also played for Staffordshire.

One of his Staffordshire team-mates was the great bowler Sydney Barnes, whose last match for Staffordshire was in 1935. Hollowood drew two cartoons of Barnes, which appear in his book Cricket on the Brain. One depicts him leaping in the air as he appeals for a dismissal and with his index finger raised as though he himself is adjudicating on the appeal. It is entitled 'A.N. Other lbw Barnes.... 0'. John Arlott wrote in his review of the book for Wisden: "...his two caricatures of S.F. Barnes would seem transcendent if they were not outweighed by his chapter on that great bowler which is a fine passage of cricket literature... this is a book of many and well-cut facets."

Hollowood died 28 March 1981 at Shamley Green, Surrey.

 Bibliography 

 Author The Things We See No.4 (Pottery and Glass), Penguin, 1947.Britain Inside-Out, Sidgwick & Jackson, 1948.Scowle and Other Papers, Penguin, 1948.Poor Little Rich World, Nelson, 1948.The Hawksmoor Scandals, George C. Harrap, 1949.Cornish Engineers, Holman Brothers Ltd, 1951.The Story of Morro Velho, St. John d'el Rey Mining Co, 1955.Tory Story: Incorporating 'Living with Labour' and 'Liberal Outlook', Hammond in conjunction with Transworld, 1964.Pont: An Account of the Life and Work of Graham Laidler, The Great Punch Artist, Collins, 1969, .Cricket on the Brain, Eyre & Spottiswoode, 1970, .Tales of Tommy Barr, with Jane Hollowood, Chatto, 1970, .Funny Money, Macdonald and Jane's, 1975, .

 Illustrator When I Was a Lad, by A. A. Thomson, Epworth Press, 1964.Organo Pleno, by Gordon Reynolds, Novello, 1970, .Full Swell, by Gordon Reynolds, Novello, 1972, .

 Editor Pick of Punch, 1960, Hutchinson.The Women of Punch, Arthur Barker, 1961.Pick of Punch, 1962, Arthur Barker.Pick of Punch, 1963, Hutchinson.Pick of Punch, 1964, Hutchinson.Pick of Punch, 1965, Hutchinson.Pick of Punch, 1966, Hutchinson.Pick of Punch, 1967, Hutchinson.Pick of Punch, 1968'', Hutchinson.

Notes

References 
Obituary in Wisden Cricketers' Almanack, 1982 edition, p1203
CricketArchive
Brief biography

1910 births
1981 deaths
Cricket historians and writers
English cricketers
English cartoonists
English male journalists
English magazine editors
English satirists
Alumni of the University of London
People associated with the London School of Economics
Academics of Loughborough University
Staffordshire cricketers
20th-century  British economists
English male non-fiction writers
Punch (magazine) people
People from Burslem